Bukit Rotan is a small town in Kuala Selangor District, Selangor, Malaysia. The Kampung Kuantan's fireflies, a major tourist attraction is located here.
It was a big area for plantation. They plant palm oil and there is a few company who runs the plantation as example, Sime darby

Kuala Selangor District
Towns in Selangor